

Ra 

 Jean-Paul Racine b. 1928 first elected in 1958 as Liberal member for Beauce, Quebec.
 Bob Rae b. 1948 first elected in 1978 as New Democratic Party member for Broadview, Ontario.
 John Rafferty b. 1953 first elected in 2008 as New Democratic member for Thunder Bay—Rainy River, Ontario.
 Samuel Victor Railton b. 1906 first elected in 1972 as Liberal member for Welland, Ontario.
 Marke Raines b. 1927 first elected in 1974 as Liberal member for Burnaby—Seymour, British Columbia.
 Joseph Hormisdas Rainville b. 1875 first elected in 1911 as Conservative member for Chambly—Verchères, Quebec.
 Lisa Raitt b. 1968 first elected in 2008 as Conservative member for Halton, Ontario. 
 James Rajotte b. 1970 first elected in 2000 as Canadian Alliance member for Edmonton Southwest, Alberta.
 James Layton Ralston b. 1881 first elected in 1926 as Liberal member for Shelburne—Yarmouth, Nova Scotia.
 Jack Ramsay b. 1937 first elected in 1993 as Reform member for Crowfoot, Alberta.
 Tracey Ramsey b. 1971 first elected in 2015 as New Democratic Party member for Essex, Ontario.
 James Palmer Rankin b. 1855 first elected in 1908 as Liberal member for Perth North, Ontario.
 John Rankin b. 1820 first elected in 1867 as Conservative member for Renfrew North, Ontario.
 Murray Rankin b. 1950 first elected in 2012 as New Democratic Party member for Victoria, British Columbia. 
 Reynold Rapp b. 1901 first elected in 1958 as Progressive Conservative member for Humboldt—Melfort, Saskatchewan.
 Yasmin Ratansi b. 1951 first elected in 2004 as Liberal member for Don Valley East, Ontario.
 J.-Georges Ratelle b. 1883 first elected in 1949 as Liberal member for Lafontaine, Quebec.
 Brent Rathgeber b. 1964 first elected in 2008 as Conservative member for Edmonton—St. Albert, Alberta. 
 Valentine Ratz b. 1848 first elected in 1896 as Liberal member for Middlesex North, Ontario.
 Mathieu Ravignat b. 1973 first elected in 2011 as New Democratic Party member for Pontiac, Quebec.
 Donald Paul Ravis b. 1940 first elected in 1984 as Progressive Conservative member for Saskatoon East, Saskatchewan.
 William Hallett Ray b. 1825 first elected in 1867 as Anti-Confederate member for Annapolis, Nova Scotia.
Alain Rayes b. 1971 first elected in 2015 as Conservative member for Richmond—Arthabaska, Quebec.
 Léon-Joseph Raymond b. 1901 first elected in 1945 as Liberal member for Wright, Quebec.
 Maxime Raymond b. 1883 first elected in 1925 as Liberal member for Beauharnois, Quebec.
 Raymond Raymond b. 1905 first elected in 1957 as Liberal member for Terrebonne, Quebec.
 William Gawtress Raymond b. 1855 first elected in 1921 as Liberal member for Brantford, Ontario.
 Francine Raynault b. 1945 first elected in 2011 as New Democratic Party member for Joliette, Quebec.

Re 

 Charles Edward Rea b. 1902 first elected in 1955 as Progressive Conservative member for Spadina, Ontario.
 Joseph Read b. 1849 first elected in 1917 as Laurier Liberal member for Prince, Prince Edward Island.
 Robert Read b. 1814 first elected in 1867 as Conservative member for Hastings East, Ontario.
 Brad Redekopp first elected in 2019 as Conservative member for Saskatoon West, Saskatchewan. 
 James Redford b. 1821 first elected in 1867 as Liberal member for Perth North, Ontario.
 Daniel Lee Redman b. 1889 first elected in 1917 as Unionist member for East Calgary, Alberta.
 Karen Redman b. 1953 first elected in 1997 as Liberal member for Kitchener Centre, Ontario.
 Alan Redway b. 1935 first elected in 1984 as Progressive Conservative member for York East, Ontario.
 Julian Alexander Arnott Reed b. 1936 first elected in 1993 as Liberal member for Halton—Peel, Ontario.
 William Samuel Reed b. 1864 first elected in 1921 as Progressive member for Frontenac, Ontario.
 Geoff Regan b. 1959 first elected in 1993 as Liberal member for Halifax West, Nova Scotia.
 Gerald Regan b. 1929 first elected in 1963 as Liberal member for Halifax, Nova Scotia.
 Erhart Regier b. 1916 first elected in 1953 as Cooperative Commonwealth Federation member for Burnaby—Coquitlam, British Columbia.
 Roger E. Régimbal b. 1921 first elected in 1965 as Progressive Conservative member for Argenteuil—Deux-Montagnes, Quebec.
 Laurier Arthur Régnier b. 1903 first elected in 1958 as Progressive Conservative member for St. Boniface, Manitoba.
 Ian Angus Ross Reid b. 1952 first elected in 1988 as Progressive Conservative member for St. John's East, Newfoundland and Labrador.
 James Reid b. 1839 first elected in 1900 as Liberal member for Restigouche, New Brunswick.
 James Reid b. 1839 first elected in 1881 as Liberal-Conservative member for Cariboo, British Columbia.
 John Dowsley Reid b. 1859 first elected in 1891 as Conservative member for Grenville South, Ontario.
 John Flaws Reid b. 1860 first elected in 1917 as Liberal member for Mackenzie, Saskatchewan.
 John Mercer Reid b. 1937 first elected in 1965 as Liberal member for Kenora—Rainy River, Ontario.
 Joseph Lloyd Reid b. 1917 first elected in 1979 as Progressive Conservative member for St. Catharines, Ontario.
 Scott Reid b. 1964 first elected in 2000 as Canadian Alliance member for Lanark—Carleton, Ontario.
 Thomas Reid b. 1886 first elected in 1930 as Liberal member for New Westminster, British Columbia.
 Peter Reilly first elected in 1972 as Progressive Conservative member for Ottawa West, Ontario.
 John Henry Reimer b. 1936 first elected in 1979 as Progressive Conservative member for Kitchener, Ontario.
 Russell Earl Reinke b. 1921 first elected in 1953 as Liberal member for Hamilton South, Ontario.
 Michelle Rempel Garner b. 1980 first elected in 2011 as Conservative member for Calgary Centre-North, Alberta. 
 Auguste Renaud b. 1835 first elected in 1867 as Liberal member for Kent, New Brunswick.
 Almon Secord Rennie b. 1882 first elected in 1934 as Liberal member for Oxford South, Ontario.
 George Septimus Rennie b. 1866 first elected in 1926 as Conservative member for Hamilton East, Ontario.
 John Reynolds b. 1942 first elected in 1972 as Progressive Conservative member for Burnaby—Richmond—Delta, British Columbia.

Rh 

 Eugène Rhéaume b. 1932 first elected in 1963 as Progressive Conservative member for Northwest Territories, Northwest Territories.
 Joseph-Théodule Rhéaume b. 1874 first elected in 1922 as Liberal member for Jacques Cartier, Quebec.
 Pierre Auguste Martial Rhéaume b. 1882 first elected in 1930 as Liberal member for St. Johns—Iberville, Quebec.
 Edgar Nelson Rhodes b. 1877 first elected in 1908 as Conservative member for Cumberland, Nova Scotia.

Ri 

 Guy Ricard b. 1942 first elected in 1984 as Progressive Conservative member for Laval, Quebec.
 Théogène Ricard b. 1909 first elected in 1957 as Progressive Conservative member for Saint-Hyacinthe—Bagot, Quebec.
 Charles Richard b. 1900 first elected in 1958 as Progressive Conservative member for Kamouraska, Quebec.
 Clovis-Thomas Richard b. 1892 first elected in 1945 as Liberal member for Gloucester, New Brunswick.
 Édouard Émery Richard b. 1844 first elected in 1872 as Liberal member for Mégantic, Quebec.
 Jean-Thomas Richard b. 1907 first elected in 1945 as Liberal member for Ottawa East, Ontario.
 Joseph-Adolphe Richard b. 1887 first elected in 1949 as Liberal member for Saint-Maurice—Laflèche, Quebec.
 Albert Norton Richards b. 1822 first elected in 1872 as Liberal member for Leeds South, Ontario.
 Blake Richards b. 1974 first elected in 2008 as Conservative member for Wild Rose, Alberta. 
 James William Richards b. 1850 first elected in 1908 as Liberal member for Prince, Prince Edward Island.
 Claude Sartoris Richardson b. 1900 first elected in 1954 as Liberal member for St. Lawrence—St. George, Quebec.
 George Richardson b. 1917 first elected in 1979 as Progressive Conservative member for Humboldt—Lake Centre, Saskatchewan.
 James Armstrong Richardson b. 1922 first elected in 1968 as Liberal member for Winnipeg South, Manitoba.
 John Richardson b. 1932 first elected in 1993 as Liberal member for Perth—Wellington—Waterloo, Ontario.
 Lee Richardson b. 1947 first elected in 1988 as Progressive Conservative member for Calgary Southeast, Alberta.
 Matthew Kendal Richardson b. 1839 first elected in 1900 as Liberal-Conservative member for Grey South, Ontario.
 Robert Lorne Richardson b. 1860 first elected in 1896 as Liberal member for Lisgar, Manitoba.
 Robin Mark Richardson b. 1942 first elected in 1979 as Progressive Conservative member for Beaches, Ontario.
 Matthew Henry Richey b. 1828 first elected in 1878 as Liberal-Conservative member for Halifax, Nova Scotia.
 Wilbert Franklin Rickard b. 1884 first elected in 1935 as Liberal member for Durham, Ontario.
 Greg Rickford b. 1967 first elected in 2008 as Conservative member for Kenora, Ontario.
 George Saunders Rideout b. 1945 first elected in 1988 as Liberal member for Moncton, New Brunswick.
 Margaret Rideout b. 1923 first elected in 1964 as Liberal member for Westmorland, New Brunswick.
 Sherwood Rideout b. 1917 first elected in 1962 as Liberal member for Westmorland, New Brunswick.
 Timothy Byron Rider b. 1848 first elected in 1891 as Liberal member for Stanstead, Quebec.
 Louis Riel b. 1844 first elected in 1873 as Independent member for Provencher, Manitoba.
 Nelson Riis b. 1942 first elected in 1980 as New Democratic Party member for Kamloops—Shuswap, British Columbia.
 Daniel Aloysius Riley b. 1916 first elected in 1949 as Liberal member for St. John—Albert, New Brunswick.
 George Riley b. 1843 first elected in 1902 as Liberal member for Victoria, British Columbia.
 Côme Isaïe Rinfret b. 1847 first elected in 1878 as Liberal member for Lotbinière, Quebec.
 Édouard-Gabriel Rinfret b. 1905 first elected in 1945 as Liberal member for Outremont, Quebec.
 Louis Édouard Fernand Rinfret b. 1883 first elected in 1920 as Liberal member for St. James, Quebec.
 Maurice Rinfret b. 1915 first elected in 1962 as Liberal member for Saint-Jacques, Quebec.
 Bob Ringma b. 1928 first elected in 1993 as Reform member for Nanaimo—Cowichan, British Columbia.
 Pierrette Ringuette b. 1955 first elected in 1993 as Liberal member for Madawaska—Victoria, New Brunswick.
 Louis Joseph Riopel b. 1841 first elected in 1882 as Conservative member for Bonaventure, Quebec.
 Jean Rioux b. 1953 first elected in 2015 as Liberal member for Saint-Jean, Quebec.
 Ronald Stuart Ritchie b. 1918 first elected in 1979 as Progressive Conservative member for York East, Ontario.
 William Gordon Ritchie b. 1918 first elected in 1968 as Progressive Conservative member for Dauphin, Manitoba.
 Gerry Ritz b. 1951 first elected in 1997 as Reform member for Battlefords—Lloydminster, Saskatchewan.
 Louis Alfred Adhémar Rivet b. 1873 first elected in 1904 as Liberal member for Hochelaga, Quebec.

Ro 

 James Alexander Robb b. 1859 first elected in 1908 as Liberal member for Huntingdon, Quebec.
 Eusèbe Roberge b. 1874 first elected in 1922 as Liberal member for Mégantic, Quebec.
 Gabriel Roberge b. 1918 first elected in 1958 as Liberal member for Mégantic, Quebec.
 Louis-Édouard Roberge b. 1896 first elected in 1949 as Liberal member for Stanstead, Quebec.
 Anna Roberts first elected in 2021 as Conservative member for King—Vaughan, Ontario.
 John Roberts b. 1933 first elected in 1968 as Liberal member for York—Simcoe, Ontario.
 Alexander Robertson b. 1838 first elected in 1882 as Conservative member for Hastings West, Ontario.
 Frederick Greystock Robertson b. 1909 first elected in 1949 as Liberal member for Northumberland, Ontario.
 James Edwin Robertson b. 1840 first elected in 1882 as Liberal member for King's County, Prince Edward Island.
 John Ross Robertson b. 1841 first elected in 1896 as Independent Conservative member for Toronto East, Ontario.
 Thomas Robertson b. 1827 first elected in 1878 as Liberal member for Hamilton, Ontario.
 Thomas Robertson b. 1852 first elected in 1878 as Liberal member for Shelburne, Nova Scotia.
 Albany M. Robichaud b. 1903 first elected in 1952 as Progressive Conservative member for Gloucester, New Brunswick.
 Fernand Robichaud b. 1939 first elected in 1984 as Liberal member for Westmorland—Kent, New Brunswick.
 Hédard-J. Robichaud b. 1911 first elected in 1953 as Liberal member for Gloucester, New Brunswick.
 Jean George Robichaud b. 1883 first elected in 1922 as Liberal member for Gloucester, New Brunswick.
 Louis-Prudent-Alexandre Robichaud b. 1890 first elected in 1935 as Liberal member for Kent, New Brunswick.
 Ferdinand-Joseph Robidoux b. 1875 first elected in 1911 as Conservative member for Kent, New Brunswick.
 Honoré Robillard b. 1835 first elected in 1887 as Liberal-Conservative member for City of Ottawa, Ontario.
 Lucienne Robillard b. 1945 first elected in 1995 as Liberal member for Saint-Henri—Westmount, Quebec.
 Ulysse Janvier Robillard b. 1826 first elected in 1872 as Independent Conservative member for Beauharnois, Quebec.
 Yves Robillard b. 1942 first elected in 2015 as Liberal member for Marc-Aurèle-Fortin, Quebec.
 Andrew Ernest Robinson b. 1893 first elected in 1945 as Progressive Conservative member for Bruce, Ontario.
 Ernest William Robinson b. 1875 first elected in 1921 as Liberal member for Kings, Nova Scotia.
 Jabel Robinson b. 1831 first elected in 1900 as Independent member for Elgin West, Ontario.
 James Robinson b. 1852 first elected in 1896 as Conservative member for Northumberland, New Brunswick.
 John Beverley Robinson b. 1821 first elected in 1872 as Conservative member for Algoma, Ontario.
 Sidney Cecil Robinson b. 1870 first elected in 1925 as Conservative member for Essex West, Ontario.
 Svend Robinson b. 1952 first elected in 1979 as New Democratic Party member for Burnaby, British Columbia.
 William Alfred Robinson b. 1905 first elected in 1945 as Liberal member for Simcoe East, Ontario.
 William Kenneth Robinson b. 1927 first elected in 1968 as Liberal member for Lakeshore, Ontario.
 Clément Robitaille b. 1873 first elected in 1921 as Liberal member for Maisonneuve, Quebec.
 Jean-Marc Robitaille b. 1955 first elected in 1988 as Progressive Conservative member for Terrebonne, Quebec.
 Lorenzo Robitaille b. 1883 first elected in 1906 as Independent Liberal member for Quebec County, Quebec.
 Théodore Robitaille b. 1834 first elected in 1867 as Conservative member for Bonaventure, Quebec.
 Douglas James Roche b. 1929 first elected in 1972 as Progressive Conservative member for Edmonton—Strathcona, Alberta.
 William Roche b. 1842 first elected in 1900 as Liberal member for Halifax, Nova Scotia.
 William James Roche b. 1859 first elected in 1896 as Conservative member for Marquette, Manitoba.
 Joseph Irenée Rochefort b. 1910 first elected in 1949 as Liberal member for Champlain, Quebec.
 Gilles Rocheleau b. 1935 first elected in 1988 as Liberal member for Hull—Aylmer, Quebec.
 Yves Rocheleau b. 1944 first elected in 1993 as Bloc Québécois member for Trois-Rivières, Quebec.
 John Rochester b. 1822 first elected in 1872 as Conservative member for Carleton, Ontario.
 Gédéon Rochon b. 1877 first elected in 1915 as Conservative member for Terrebonne, Quebec.
 Jean-Léo Rochon b. 1902 first elected in 1962 as Liberal member for Laval, Quebec.
 Allan Rock b. 1947 first elected in 1993 as Liberal member for Etobicoke Centre, Ontario.
 Raymond Rock b. 1922 first elected in 1962 as Liberal member for Jacques-Cartier—Lasalle, Quebec.
 Thomas George Roddick b. 1846 first elected in 1896 as Conservative member for St. Antoine, Quebec.
 Romuald Rodrigue b. 1929 first elected in 1968 as Ralliement Créditiste member for Beauce, Quebec.
 John Rodriguez b. 1937 first elected in 1972 as New Democratic Party member for Nickel Belt, Ontario.
 Pablo Rodriguez b. 1967 first elected in 2004 as Liberal member for Honoré-Mercier, Quebec.
 Arthur Roebuck b. 1878 first elected in 1940 as Liberal member for Trinity, Ontario.
 Alexander Rogers b. 1842 first elected in 1878 as Liberal member for Albert, New Brunswick.
 Churence Rogers b. 1953 first elected in 2017 as Liberal member for Bonavista—Burin—Trinity, Newfoundland and Labrador. 
 David Dickson Rogers b. 1845 first elected in 1896 as Patrons of Industry member for Frontenac, Ontario.
 Harris George Rogers b. 1891 first elected in 1958 as Progressive Conservative member for Red Deer, Alberta.
 Norman McLeod Rogers b. 1894 first elected in 1935 as Liberal member for Kingston City, Ontario.
 Robert Rogers b. 1864 first elected in 1911 as Conservative member for Winnipeg, Manitoba.
 Anthony Roman b. 1936 first elected in 1984 with no affiliation as the member for York North, Ontario.
 Sherry Romanado b. 1974 first elected in 2015 as Liberal member for Longueuil—Charles-LeMoyne, Quebec.
 Bill Rompkey b. 1936 first elected in 1972 as Liberal member for Grand Falls—White Bay—Labrador, Newfoundland and Labrador.
 Aristide Stanislas Joseph Rompré b. 1912 first elected in 1958 as Progressive Conservative member for Portneuf, Quebec.
 Gilbert F. Rondeau b. 1928 first elected in 1962 as Social Credit member for Shefford, Quebec.
 Lianne Rood b. 1979 first elected in 2019 as Conservative member for Lambton—Kent—Middlesex, Ontario. 
 William Frederick Roome b. 1841 first elected in 1887 as Conservative member for Middlesex West, Ontario.
 James Rooney b. 1897 first elected in 1949 as Liberal member for St. Paul's, Ontario.
 Dave Rooney b. 1937 first elected in 1972 as Liberal member for Bonavista—Trinity—Conception, Newfoundland and Labrador.
 Bennett Rosamond b. 1833 first elected in 1891 as Conservative member for Lanark North, Ontario.
 Francis James Roscoe b. 1831 first elected in 1874 as Independent Liberal member for Victoria, British Columbia.
 Fred Rose b. 1907 first elected in 1943 as Labor Progressive member for Cartier, Quebec.
 John Rose b. 1820 first elected in 1867 as Liberal-Conservative member for Huntingdon, Quebec.
 Mark Rose b. 1924 first elected in 1968 as New Democratic Party member for Fraser Valley West, British Columbia.
 Alexander Charles Ross b. 1847 first elected in 1906 as Liberal member for North Cape Breton and Victoria, Nova Scotia.
 Arthur Edward Ross b. 1870 first elected in 1921 as Conservative member for Kingston, Ontario.
 Arthur Wellington Ross b. 1846 first elected in 1882 as Liberal-Conservative member for Lisgar, Manitoba.
 Douglas Ross b. 1883 first elected in 1935 as Conservative member for St. Paul's, Ontario.
 Duncan Ross b. 1870 first elected in 1904 as Liberal member for Yale—Cariboo, British Columbia.
 Duncan Campbell Ross b. 1871 first elected in 1909 as Liberal member for Middlesex West, Ontario.
 Duncan Graham Ross b. 1891 first elected in 1935 as Liberal member for Middlesex East, Ontario.
 George Henry Ross b. 1878 first elected in 1940 as Liberal member for Calgary East, Alberta.
 George William Ross b. 1841 first elected in 1872 as Liberal member for Middlesex West, Ontario.
 Hugo Homer Ross b. 1847 first elected in 1891 as Conservative member for Dundas, Ontario.
 James Ross b. 1817 first elected in 1869 as Liberal member for Wellington Centre, Ontario.
 James Arthur Ross b. 1893 first elected in 1940 as National Government member for Souris, Manitoba.
 James Hamilton Ross b. 1856 first elected in 1902 as Liberal member for Yukon, Yukon.
 Jean Auguste Ross b. 1851 first elected in 1897 as Liberal member for Rimouski, Quebec.
 John Gordon Ross b. 1891 first elected in 1925 as Liberal member for Moose Jaw, Saskatchewan.
 John Jones Ross b. 1831 first elected in 1867 as Conservative member for Champlain, Quebec.
 John Sylvester Ross b. 1821 first elected in 1867 as Liberal-Conservative member for Dundas, Ontario.
 Lewis Ross  b. 1825 first elected in 1872 as Liberal member for Durham East, Ontario.
 Thomas Edwin Ross b. 1873 first elected in 1921 as Progressive member for Simcoe North, Ontario.
 Thomas Hambly Ross b. 1886 first elected in 1940 as Liberal member for Hamilton East, Ontario.
 Walter Ross b. 1817 first elected in 1867 as Liberal member for Prince Edward, Ontario.
 William Ross b. 1824 first elected in 1867 as Anti-Confederate member for Victoria, Nova Scotia.
 William Ross b. 1854 first elected in 1900 as Liberal member for Ontario South, Ontario.
 Carlo Rossi b. 1925 first elected in 1979 as Liberal member for Bourassa, Quebec.
 Anthony Rota b. 1961 first elected in 2004 as Liberal member for Nipissing—Timiskaming, Ontario.
 François Fortunat Rouleau b. 1849 first elected in 1874 as Liberal-Conservative member for Dorchester, Quebec.
 Guy Rouleau b. 1923 first elected in 1953 as Liberal member for Dollard, Quebec.
 Jean Rousseau b. 1961 first elected in 2011 as New Democratic Party member for Compton—Stanstead.
 Jeffrey Alexandre Rousseau b. 1852 first elected in 1900 as Liberal member for Champlain, Quebec.
 Joseph Hervé Rousseau b. 1877 first elected in 1950 as Independent Liberal member for Rimouski, Quebec.
 Félix Routhier b. 1827 first elected in 1878 as Conservative member for Prescott, Ontario.
 James Rowand b. 1830 first elected in 1887 as Liberal member for Bruce West, Ontario.
 Percy John Rowe b. 1893 first elected in 1935 as Social Credit member for Athabaska, Alberta.
 William Earl Rowe b. 1894 first elected in 1925 as Conservative member for Dufferin—Simcoe, Ontario.
 Newton Rowell b. 1867 first elected in 1917 as Unionist member for Durham, Ontario.
 Doug Rowland b. 1940 first elected in 1970 as New Democratic Party member for Selkirk, Manitoba.
 Jack Roxburgh b. 1901 first elected in 1962 as Liberal member for Norfolk, Ontario.
 Charles François Roy b. 1835 first elected in 1877 as Conservative member for Kamouraska, Quebec.
 Cyrias Roy b. 1864 first elected in 1908 as Liberal member for Montmagny, Quebec.
 Fabien Roy b. 1928 first elected in 1979 as Social Credit member for Beauce, Quebec.
 Gustave Roy b. 1907 first elected in 1953 as Liberal member for Labelle, Quebec.
 J.-Aurélien Roy b. 1910 first elected in 1962 as Social Credit member for Lévis, Quebec.
 Jean Robert Roy b. 1923 first elected in 1968 as Liberal member for Timmins, Ontario.
 Jean-Yves Roy b. 1949 first elected in 2000 as Bloc Québécois member for Matapédia—Matane, Quebec.
 Joseph Alfred Ernest Roy b. 1871 first elected in 1908 as Liberal member for Dorchester, Quebec.
 Joseph Sasseville Roy b. 1895 first elected in 1940 as Independent Conservative member for Gaspé, Quebec.
 Marcel-Claude Roy b. 1936 first elected in 1968 as Liberal member for Laval, Quebec.
 Nicole Roy-Arcelin b. 1941 first elected in 1988 as Progressive Conservative member for Ahuntsic, Quebec.
 Joseph Royal b. 1837 first elected in 1879 as Conservative member for Provencher, Manitoba.

Ru 
 Kim Rudd b. 1957 first elected in 2015 as Liberal member for Northumberland—Peterborough South, Ontario.
 Alex Ruff b. 1974 first elected in 2019 as Conservative member for Bruce—Grey—Owen Sound, Ontario.
 Dan Ruimy b. 1962 first elected in 2015 as Liberal member for Pitt Meadows—Maple Ridge, British Columbia.
 Don Rusnak b. 1975 first elected in 2015 as Liberal member for Thunder Bay—Rainy River, Ontario.
 Benjamin Russell b. 1849 first elected in 1896 as Liberal member for Halifax, Nova Scotia.
 Joseph Russell b. 1868 first elected in 1908 as Independent member for Toronto East, Ontario.
 Todd Russell b. 1966 first elected in 2005 as Liberal member for Labrador, Newfoundland and Labrador.
 William Windfield Rutan b. 1865 first elected in 1908 as Liberal member for Prince Albert, Saskatchewan.
 James Warren Rutherford b. 1875 first elected in 1926 as Liberal member for Kent, Ontario.
 John Gunion Rutherford b. 1857 first elected in 1897 as Liberal member for Macdonald, Manitoba.

Ry 

 George Ryan b. 1806 first elected in 1867 as Liberal member for King's, New Brunswick.
 Joseph O'Connell Ryan b. 1841 first elected in 1874 as Liberal member for Marquette, Manitoba.
 Michael Patrick Ryan b. 1825 first elected in 1868 as Liberal-Conservative member for Montreal West, Quebec.
 Robert Ryan b. 1878 first elected in 1940 as Liberal member for Three Rivers, Quebec.
 Perry Ryan b. 1918 first elected in 1962 as Liberal member for Spadina, Ontario.
 William Michael Ryan b. 1887 first elected in 1935 as Liberal member for St. John—Albert, New Brunswick.
 Edmond Baird Ryckman b. 1866 first elected in 1921 as Conservative member for Toronto East, Ontario.
 Samuel Shobal Ryckman b. 1849 first elected in 1891 as Conservative member for Hamilton, Ontario.
 Robert Edwy Ryerson b. 1865 first elected in 1925 as Conservative member for Brantford City, Ontario.
 John Charles Rykert b. 1832 first elected in 1878 as Conservative member for Lincoln, Ontario.
 Joseph Rymal b. 1821 first elected in 1867 as Liberal member for Wentworth South, Ontario.
 Philip Bernard Rynard b. 1897 first elected in 1957 as Progressive Conservative member for Simcoe East, Ontario.

R